John Beaufort, 1st Marquess of Somerset and 1st Marquess of Dorset, later only 1st Earl of Somerset,  (c. 1373 – 16 March 1410) was an English nobleman and politician. He was the first of the four illegitimate children of John of Gaunt (1340–1399) (third surviving son of King Edward III) by his mistress Katherine Swynford, whom he later married in 1396. 

The Beaufort children were declared legitimate twice by parliament, first during the reign of King Richard II, in 1397, which was confirmed by Henry IV, as well as by Pope Boniface IX in September 1396. Even though they were the grandchildren of Edward III and next in the line of succession after their father's legitimate children by his first two wives, the Beauforts were barred from succession to the throne by their half-brother Henry IV.

Early life

Beaufort's surname (properly de Beaufort, "from Beaufort") probably reflects his birthplace at his father's castle and manor of Beaufort ("beautiful stronghold") in Champagne, France. The Portcullis heraldic badge of the Beauforts, now the emblem of the House of Commons, is believed to have been based on that of the castle of Beaufort, now demolished.

Between May and September 1390, Beaufort saw military service in North Africa in the Barbary Crusade led by Louis II, Duke of Bourbon. In 1394, he was in Lithuania serving with the Teutonic Knights.

John was created Earl of Somerset on 10 February 1397, just a few days after the legitimation of the Beaufort children was recognized by Parliament. The same month, he was also appointed Admiral of the Irish fleet, as well as Constable of Dover Castle and Warden of the Cinque Ports. In May, his admiralty was extended to include the northern fleet. That summer, the new earl became one of the noblemen who helped Richard II free himself from the power of the Lords Appellant. As a reward, he was created Marquess of Somerset and Marquess of Dorset on 29 September, and sometime later that year he was made a Knight of the Garter and appointed Lieutenant of Aquitaine. In addition, two days before his elevation as a Marquess he married the king's niece, Margaret Holland, sister of Thomas Holland, 1st Duke of Surrey, another of the counter-appellants. John remained in the king's favour even after his older half-brother Henry Bolingbroke (later Henry IV) was banished from England in 1398.

Later career
After Richard II was deposed by Henry Bolingbroke in 1399, the new king rescinded the titles that had been given to the counter-appellants, and thus John Beaufort became merely Earl of Somerset again. Nevertheless, he proved loyal to his half-brother's reign, serving in various military commands and on some important diplomatic missions. It was Beaufort who was given the confiscated estates of the Welsh rebel leader Owain Glyndŵr in 1400, although he would not have been able to take possession of these estates unless he had lived until after 1415. In 1404, he was named Constable of England.

Family
John Beaufort and his wife Margaret Holland, the daughter of Thomas Holland, 2nd Earl of Kent and Alice FitzAlan, had six children. His granddaughter Lady Margaret Beaufort married Edmund Tudor, 1st Earl of Richmond, the son of Dowager Queen Catherine of Valois by Owen Tudor.

John Beaufort, 1st Earl of Somerset, died in the Hospital of St Katharine's by the Tower. He was buried in St Michael's Chapel in Canterbury Cathedral.

His children included the following:
Henry Beaufort, 2nd Earl of Somerset (1401 – 25 November 1418)
John Beaufort, 1st Duke of Somerset (baptised 25 March 1404 – 27 May 1444) – father of Margaret Beaufort, Countess of Richmond and Derby, mother of King Henry VII of England
Joan Beaufort, Queen of Scotland (1404 – 15 July 1445) – married James I, King of Scots.
Thomas Beaufort, Count of Perche (1405 – 3 October 1431)
Edmund Beaufort, 2nd Duke of Somerset (1406 – 22 May 1455)
Margaret Beaufort, Countess of Devon (1409–1449) – married Thomas de Courtenay, 13th Earl of Devon.

Appointments

Lord Warden of the Cinque Ports: 1398
Admiral of the West: 1397
Admiral of the Irish Fleet: 1397
Lieutenant of Aquitaine: 1397
Admiral of the North and Western Fleets: 9 May 1398 – 15 November 1399
Lord High Constable of England: 1404
Admiral of the North and Western Fleets: May 1406 – June 1407

Arms
As a legitimised grandson of King Edward III, Beaufort bore that king's royal arms, differenced by a bordure gobony argent and azure.

Arms of Beaufort, legitimised progeny of John of Gaunt, 3rd surviving son of King Edward III: Royal arms of King Edward III within a bordure compony argent and azure (see Royal arms of England). The arms were updated when the Kings of England adopted France modern, having been adopted by the King of France in 1376. Charles, an illegitimate son of Henry Beaufort, 3rd Duke of Somerset (1436–1464), took the surname "Somerset" together with the Beaufort arms and was created Baron Herbert (1461) and Earl of Worcester (1513). In 1682 his descendant Henry Somerset, 3rd Marquess of Worcester (1629–1700), was created Duke of Beaufort. These arms are thus used by Beaufort, Duke of Somerset (extinct) and Somerset, Duke of Beaufort (extant).

Ancestry

Notes

References
Armitage-Smith, Sydney. John of Gaunt, King of Castile and Leon, Duke of Lancaster, &c.. Constable, 1904.
 
 
Jones, Michael K, and Malcolm G. Underwood, The King's Mother: Lady Margaret Beaufort, Countess of Richmond and Derby. Cambridge University Press, 1992. see especially pp. 17–22

External links
 The Beaufort Family
 The Courtenay Family

1370s births
1410 deaths
Year of birth uncertain
14th-century English Navy personnel
15th-century English Navy personnel
John Beaufort, 1st Earl of Somerset
Christians of the Barbary Crusade
Earls of Somerset
English admirals
Knights of the Garter
Lord High Admirals of England
Lords Warden of the Cinque Ports
Marquesses in the Peerage of England
Marquesses of Dorset
Peers created by Richard II
Younger sons of dukes